Kanton-Kommuna is a rural locality (a selo) in Novotroitsky Selsoviet of Blagoveshchensky District, Amur Oblast, Russia. The population was 136 as of 2018. There are 17 streets.

Geography 
Kanton-Kommuna is located on the left bank of the Amur River, 19 km north of Blagoveshchensk (the district's administrative centre) by road. Chigiri is the nearest rural locality.

References 

Rural localities in Blagoveshchensky District, Amur Oblast